A dog-leg is a configuration of stairs between two floors of a building, often a domestic building, in which a flight of stairs ascends to a quarter-landing before turning at a right angle and continuing upwards. The flights do not have to be equal, and frequently are not.

Structurally, the flights of a dog-leg stair are usually supported by the quarter-landing, which spans the adjoining flank walls.

From the design point of view, the main advantages of a dog-leg stair are:

 To allow an arrangement that occupies a shorter, though wider, floor area than a straight flight, and so is more compact. Even though the landings consume total floor space, there is no large single dimension.
 The upper floor is not directly visible from the bottom of the stairs, thereby providing more privacy.

References

Stairs
Stairways
Architectural elements